Kirsten Iversdatter, known as Finn-Kirsten (? - 14 October 1674), was a Norwegian Sami woman, who was executed for witchcraft in Norway.

She was active as a wandering beggar in the countryside of Trøndelag. She was arrested in February 1674 and charged with witchcraft in Støren. She was accused of having the ability to cause harm by use of sorcery, and to threaten those who refuse to give her alms by doing so. This was a common accusation when beggars was accused of sorcery. In her case, her Sami origin made her suspicious, since there was a fear among the Christian Norwegians for the "Pagan Sami magic", since the Sami was still at this point often Pagans. She denied the charges, but was sentenced to death on charge of extramarital sex, since she was unmarried but still accompanied by two daughters. She confessed that she was indeed a witch, and had attended the witches' sabbath. She was transferred to  Trondheim, where she was prosecuted. She pointed out thirty accomplices. The trial attracted great attention, but the accomplices were eventually acquitted.

Finn-Kirsten was executed by burning at the stake. She was the last person to be executed for witchcraft in Trøndelag.

References

 https://snl.no/Kirsten_Iversdatter
 Mona, Marte: Berømte og gløymde trondheimskvinner. Utg. Samlaget. 2004.
 Alm, Ellen: The Last Burning of a Witch in Trondheim: The Witch-Trial Against Finn-Kirsten, 2014

Norwegian Sámi people
1674 deaths
Witch trials in Norway
People in Sámi history
People executed for witchcraft
People executed by burning
People executed by Norway by burning
17th-century Norwegian people
17th-century Norwegian women